Events from the year 1728 in Canada.

Incumbents
French Monarch: Louis XV
British and Irish Monarch: George II

Governors
Governor General of New France: Charles de la Boische, Marquis de Beauharnois
Colonial Governor of Louisiana: Étienne Perier
Governor of Nova Scotia: Lawrence Armstrong
Governor of Placentia: Samuel Gledhill

Events
 Pierre Gaultier de Varennes et de La Vérendrye was appointed commandant of the French posts on the north shore of Lake Superior and stationed at Fort Kaministiquia
 Vitus Bering sails through the Bering Strait.

Births
  - James Cook killed by Hawaiian natives, cutting short his search for Northwest Passage. (died 1779)
Samuel Holland, army officer, military engineer, surveyor, office holder, politician, and landowner (died 1801)

Deaths
 February 20 - J Raudot, Intendant of New France (born 1638)

Historical documents
Nova Scotia governor petitions King for measures to address long-standing problems of defence, communication and control

Surveyor of His Majesty's Woods instructed to mark out at least 200,000 acres of forest in Nova Scotia for Royal Navy use

"Uninhabited (except by a few Indians)" - Petition to settle colonial grey zone (now in Maine) between British and French claims

"Deep Bays, large Coves and Rivers, and most excellent Harbours" - Guide to sailing charted Newfoundland coasts

References

 
Canada
28